For information on all Manhattan College sports, see Manhattan Jaspers and Lady Jaspers

The Manhattan Jaspers baseball team is a varsity intercollegiate athletic team of Manhattan College in New York City, New York. The team is a member of the Metro Atlantic Athletic Conference, which is part of the National Collegiate Athletic Association's Division I. Its home venue is Van Cortlandt Park in the borough of the Bronx in New York City. The Jaspers are coached by David Miller.

Venues
From 2015 to 2019, the Jaspers played its home games in Dutchess Stadium in Fishkill, New York. In 2020, the Jaspers announced that they would be returning to Van Cortlandt Park for all home games.

NCAA tournament results

Jaspers in the Major Leagues

Taken from the Jaspers Baseball In The Pros.

See also
List of NCAA Division I baseball programs

References

External links